Encke may refer to:

Johann Franz Encke (1791–1865), a nineteenth-century German astronomer
Encke (crater), a lunar crater
Encke Division, a dark gap in the rings of Saturn
Comet Encke, a short-period comet
Encke (horse) (2009–2014), a thoroughbred racehorse named after the comet
Erdmann Encke (1843-1896), German sculptor

See also
 Enka (disambiguation)
 Hencke, a surname
 Heinke (disambiguation)